Florian Max Hardberger (born November 19, 1948) is an American adventurer, ship captain, aviator, ship recovery specialist, admiralty lawyer and author of maritime fiction and non-fiction adventures.

Education 
Hardberger received his high school degree in 1966 from the Castle Heights Military Academy in Lebanon, Tennessee.  He became a licensed aircraft pilot at the age of 16 while at Castle Heights.  Hardberger attended college at Nicholls State University in Thibodaux, Louisiana then transferred to the University of New Orleans for another two years of study. In 1969 he graduated early with a BA in English. During college, Hardberger became a SCUBA diver, skilled sailor and navigator.  After college, Hardberger attended the Program in Creative Writing at the University of Iowa (commonly known as the "Iowa Writers' Workshop"), where in 1972 he received a Master of Fine Arts degree in Fiction and Poetry.  In 1998, Hardberger earned a Juris Doctor degree from Northwestern California University School of Law in Sacramento, California, and was admitted to the State Bar of California.

Literary career 
Hardberger's first book was Deadweight: Owning the Ocean Freighter (1994), a textbook on ship ownership.  He followed Deadweight with his first novel, Freighter Captain (1998), a semi-autobiographical account of his adventures as a ship captain in the Caribbean. Hardberger then moved from maritime subjects to a murder mystery with his 1999 novel, The Jumping-Off Place, which was a tribute to the hardboiled detective novels of Raymond Chandler and Dashiell Hammett. On April 6, 2010, Hardberger's auto-biography about his ship recovery adventures was published by the Broadway Books imprint of Random House, entitled SEIZED! A Sea Captain's Adventures Battling Scoundrels and Pirates While Recovering Stolen Ships in the World's Most Troubled Waters.  A paperback edition of SEIZED for the British Commonwealth market will be released by Nicholas Brealey Publishing on June 24, 2010.

As a devotee of the hardboiled school of fiction, Hardberger's writing style offers gritty realism. Like his life, many of Hardberger's books are set in the seedy world of international business. His protagonists are often like himself, savvy, sardonic, and capable of violent action, and his villains are drawn from the panoply of miscreants he's met as a ship captain and maritime lawyer. Hardberger's stories are fact-based, real-world adventures from the underbelly of world commerce.

Professional career

Teaching English and playing music – 1969 to 1976
After college, Hardberger started his professional career with a short stint teaching English at Mandeville High School in Louisiana.  Hardberger then worked as a newspaper reporter for the Houma Daily Guide in Houma, Louisiana.  He left the newspaper to explore Mexico in an old school bus before returning to the United States to attend graduate school.  After he received his MFA degree in 1972, Hardberger taught English at All Saints Episcopal School in Vicksburg, Mississippi.  He left teaching to work as a drummer in various blues bands on the Chitlin Circuit.

Oilfield worker and pilot – 1977 to 1985

In 1977, Hardberger returned home to Louisiana to work as a deckhand and then as a mate on the oilfield supply vessel Magcobar Mercury in the Gulf of Mexico.  After he earned a captain's license, Hardberger's employer sent him to the Dresser-Magcobar Drilling Fluids School in Houston to learn how to become a drilling fluids engineer, also known as a "mud man."  Hardberger initially worked in oilfields off the Louisiana and Mississippi Gulf Coast and then worked as a drilling fluids consultant in Guatemala during the Guatemalan Civil War.  Between oilfield hitches, Hardberger continued his flying lessons, earning commercial and flight instructor licenses, and took a wide variety of flying jobs, including towing banners, dusting crops, doing nightly check runs for banks and transporting dead bodies for mortuaries.  Hardberger also delivered aircraft to Central America.  
Hardberger returned to the classroom for the 1984–85 school year, when he taught English and world history at Pope John Paul II High School (Slidell, Louisiana).  Hardberger briefly returned to the oilfields of Guatemala in 1985, then began crop dusting on a full-time basis in Breaux Bridge, Louisiana.  At the end of the 1986 crop dusting season, Hardberger traveled to Miami, Florida to search for new work.

Ship captain – 1986 to 1990

When Jean-Claude "Baby Doc" Duvalier was overthrown as the ruler of Haiti in 1986, trade opened up between the United States and Haiti.  The Miami River was the loading port for many small freighters in the Haitian trade.  After Hardberger left crop dusting, he searched for and soon found work on the Miami River as the captain of a small freighter engaged in that trade.  Among his commands was the Erika, a small freighter which transported cargoes throughout the Caribbean.  Hardberger's voyages on the Erika were the basis of his 1998 semi-autobiographical novel, Freighter Captain.

Recovering vessels – 1990 to present

Hardberger left the Erika to work for a Miami-based ship owner, MorganPrice & Co., as port captain responsible for overseeing port calls by the company's ships.  During this period, a MorganPrice freighter, the Patric M, was seized by a shipper in Puerto Cabello, Venezuela.  This action required Hardberger to sail the vessel out of port under the cover of night and without a clearance, in violation of Venezuelan law.  This operation was Hardberger's first vessel "extraction" and is detailed in his autobiography, Seized.

Hardberger left MorganPrice in 1990 to form his own marine consultancy business in Louisiana.  He was periodically retained by shipowners to extract their vessels from lawless ports without a clearance from local authorities.  In 1998, following his admission to the California Bar, Hardberger began to practice maritime law alongside his marine consultancy and vessel extraction business.  In 2002, Hardberger formed the ship repossession company Vessel Extractions, LLC ("VessEx") to extract vessels that have been illegitimately detained or seized in foreign countries.  In 2004, Hardberger was featured in The Learning Channel series, Repo Men:  Stealing for a Living, in a segment entitled "Repo Adventurer,"documenting his extraction of a 10,000-ton freighter from Haiti during the 2004 rebellion and his delivery of the vessel to her mortgagee in the Bahamas.

References

External links
Max Hardberger's Official Website

1948 births
Living people
American non-fiction writers
California lawyers
Iowa Writers' Workshop alumni
Maritime writers
Nicholls State University alumni
Writers from Baton Rouge, Louisiana
University of New Orleans alumni